Ensanche Luperón is a village in the Dominican Republic.

External links
Distrito Nacional sectors

Populated places in Santo Domingo